Allison Lyon Segan is a film producer.  Her feature films have garnered eight Academy Awards out of eleven nominations.  Most recently, she produced Shark Tale, an animated feature for DreamWorks that features Will Smith, Renée Zellweger, Robert De Niro, and Martin Scorsese.  Her thriller Swimfan, starring Erika Christensen and Jesse Bradford, was released by Twentieth Century Fox in September 2002 and became her fifth #1 movie at the box office on its opening weekend.  She also produced One Night at McCool's for USA Films, starring Liv Tyler, Matt Dillon, John Goodman and Michael Douglas.

As President of the Paramount Pictures-based production company Mutual Films Inc., Segan co-produced the Academy Award-winning Saving Private Ryan, directed by Steven Spielberg and starring Tom Hanks, Matt Damon and Vin Diesel; produced DreamWorks Pictures’ comedy-adventure Paulie; executive produced the action-thriller Hard Rain starring Morgan Freeman and Christian Slater; and produced The Ripper for the USA Network.

Previously, she co-produced blockbuster hits such as the action-thriller Broken Arrow, directed by John Woo and starring John Travolta and Christian Slater; Speed, starring Keanu Reeves and Sandra Bullock; and A Pyromaniac's Love Story, a romantic comedy starring Billy Baldwin and John Leguizamo.

Segan was born to a Jewish family, the daughter of Judith (née Eisenstaedt) and Loren Lyon. Allison Lyon Segan is married to television and film producer Lloyd Segan. They attend the Leo Baeck Temple in Los Angeles where her husband serves as president.

Filmography
She was a producer in all films unless otherwise noted.

Film

Television

References

Living people
American film producers
American Jews
Year of birth missing (living people)
Place of birth missing (living people)